

Gold Dome may refer to
 Gold Dome, a geodesic-shaped cultural center in Oklahoma City, Oklahoma
Gold Dome (Centenary), on the campus of Centenary College of Louisiana in Shreveport, Louisiana, United States
 Georgia State Capitol, is referred to as the "Gold Dome" because of the gold leaf applied to the structure.

Golden Dome may refer to
 Golden Dome (Monaca), a multi-purpose geodesic domed arena in Monaca, Pennsylvania
 The Golden Domes on the Fairfield, Iowa campus of Maharishi University of Management
 The Colorado State Capitol in Denver, whose distinctive golden dome contains real gold leaf
 Assassins' Gate (Green Zone), a landmark on the International Zone in Baghdad, Iraq, known as The Golden Dome
 Dome of the Rock, a shrine of great religious significance in Jerusalem
 Main Administration Building (University of Notre Dame), at the University of Notre Dame, is referred to as the Golden Dome
 St. Michael's Golden-Domed Monastery in Kiev, Ukraine

See also
Gould Dome
 Dome (disambiguation)